Dodola Airport  is an airstrip serving the city of Dodola in the Oromia Region of Ethiopia.

See also
Transport in Ethiopia
List of airports in Ethiopia

References

External links
OurAirports - Dodola
Dodola
OpenStreetMap - Dodola Airport

Airports in Ethiopia